Micheline Fluchot (born 1 November 1934) is a French sprinter. She competed in the women's 100 metres at the 1956 Summer Olympics.

References

External links
 

1934 births
Living people
Athletes (track and field) at the 1956 Summer Olympics
French female sprinters
Olympic athletes of France
Athletes from Paris
Olympic female sprinters